Today! is an album by jazz flautist Herbie Mann released on the Atlantic label featuring performances recorded in 1966.

Reception
The Allmusic review by Scott Yanow states "Flutist Herbie Mann has always had wide interests in music. For this...LP he is joined by three brass, vibraphonist Dave Pike, bassist Earl May, drummer Bruno Carr and percussionist Patato Valdes (with arrangements by Oliver Nelson) for a wide-ranging program that includes two Beatles songs, a selection from Burt Bacharach and two ancient pieces by Duke Ellington ("Creole Love Call" and "The Mooche"). In general Mann plays quite well but there is little memorable about this generally commercial effort. ".

Track listing
"Today" (Herbie Mann, Oliver Nelson) 3:45
"The Creole Love Call" (Duke Ellington) 3:46
"Don't Say I Didn't Tell You So" (Burt Bacharach, Hal David) 4:15
"Arrastao" (Norman Gimbel, Edu Lobo) 3:52
"The Mooch" (Duke Ellington, Irving Mills) 3:40
"If You Gotta Make a Fool of Somebody" (Rudy Clark) 4:58
"Yesterday" (John Lennon, Paul McCartney) 5:00
"The Night Before" (John Lennon, Paul McCartney) 3:48
Recorded in New York City on December 18, 1965 (tracks 1-4) and December 19, 1965 (tracks 5-8)

Personnel
Herbie Mann - flute
Dave Pike - vibes
Earl May - bass
Bruno Carr - drums
Carlos "Patato" Valdes - conga
Jimmy Owens - trumpet
John Hitchcock - trombone
Joe Orange - trombone
Oliver Nelson - arranger & conductor
Tom Dowd - recording engineer

Samples
"Today"
"Otha Fish"" by The Pharcyde on their Bizarre Ride II the Pharcyde album

References

1966 albums
Atlantic Records albums
Herbie Mann albums
Albums arranged by Oliver Nelson
Albums conducted by Oliver Nelson
Albums produced by Nesuhi Ertegun